Nazmabad (also Romanized as Naz̧mābād) is a village in Jahadabad Rural District, in the Central District of Anbarabad County, Kerman Province, Iran. At the 2006 census, its population was 545, in 111 families.

References 

Populated places in Anbarabad County